= Grímsbær =

Shopping centre in Reykjavík, Iceland

Coordinates: 64°07′20″N 21°52′31″W

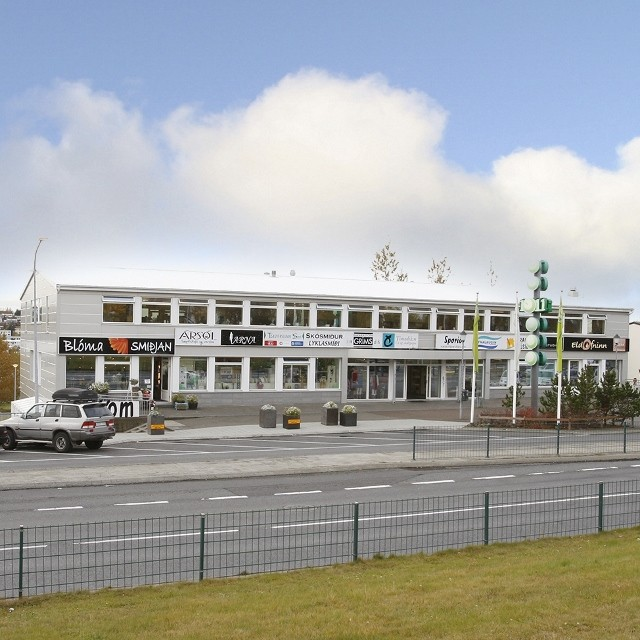
Grímsbær (front view)

Grímsbær (Icelandic pronunciation: [ˈkrimsˌpaiːr̥]) is a small shopping centre in the middle of Reykjavík, Iceland.

Originally a two-story structure built into a hillside, in 2004 a third floor was built on top of the existing structure and the centre grew to around 2000 m^{2}, which it remains to this day.
